Hiralal is a Bengali-language biopic movie which is directed by Arun Roy  and produced be Easel Movies. It is starring Kinjal Nanda, Saswata Chatterjee, Anuska Chakraborty, Shankar Chakraborty, Arna Mukhopadhyay, Tannishtha Biswas, Partha Sinha, Adhikary Koushik and Kharaj Mukherjee. The film was released on 5 March 2021.

Plot
The film is a biopic, based on the life of famous director Hiralal Sen and how he contributed to Indian Cinema.

Cast
 Kinjal Nanda as Hiralal Sen
 Kharaj Mukherjee as Girish Chandra Ghosh
 Saswata Chatterjee as Jamshedji Framji Madan
 Anuska Chakraborty as Hemangini
 Shankar Chakraborty as C.K. Sen
 Arna Mukhopadhyay as Amarendranath Dutta
 Tannishtha Biswas as Kusum Kumari Devi
 Partha Sinha as Motilal
 Adhikary Kaushik as Tarini Ukil

References

2021 films
Bengali-language Indian films
Indian documentary films